Operation Clarion was the extensive allied campaign of Strategic bombing during World War II which attacked 200 German communication network targets to open Operation Veritable/Grenade. 

3,500 bombers and nearly 5,000 fighters attacked targets across Germany in effort to destroy all means of transportation available. Targets included "rail stations, barges, docks, and bridges."

References 

World War II strategic bombing